Neocollyris contracta is a species of ground beetle in the genus Neocollyris in the family Carabidae. It was described by Horn in 1905.

References

Contracta, Neocollyris
Beetles described in 1905